Carmelo Juan Giaquinta (born 1930-06-22 in Buenos Aires) was an Argentine bishop, formerly the Archbishop Emeritus of the Diocese of Resistencia (province of Chaco).

Giaquinta was ordained priest in Buenos Aires on 1953-04-04, at the age of 22. He was appointed auxiliary bishop of Viedma (province of Río Negro) on 1980-03-11. Six years later he was transferred to the diocese of Posadas, Misiones, and on 1993-03-22 again to Resistencia, where he exercised his ministry as Archbishop until his resignation, on 2005-04-01, as customary due to his age. He died on June 22, 2011

Views

Sex education
On 2005-11-06, in line with Catholic Church teaching, he criticized the project of a law of compulsory sex education which was under study in Congress, stating that, in the case of its approval, he would "call Christians to civil disobedience". This statement was a follow-up to similarly harsh criticism by Archbishop of La Plata, Héctor Aguer.

References

External links
 Catholic-Hierarchy.org
 Criticism of sex education law: Página/12, 2005-11-07. La parábola de Baseotto II.

1930 births
2011 deaths
21st-century Roman Catholic archbishops in Argentina
People from Buenos Aires
20th-century Roman Catholic archbishops in Argentina
Roman Catholic bishops of Viedma
Roman Catholic bishops of Posadas
Roman Catholic archbishops of Resistencia